Abbott's moray eel (Gymnothorax eurostus), also known as the stout moray, is a moray eel of the family Muraenidae, found in the Indo-Pacific, antitropical in distribution. Abbott's moray eel is a shallow-water, inshore reef species, though not often seen. They are voracious nocturnal carnivores feeding mostly on reef fishes.

References

External links
 Fishes of Australia : Gymnothorax eurostus

Abbott's moray eel
Marine fish of Northern Australia
Abbott's moray ee
Abbott's moray eel